A statue of basketball player Magic Johnson by Omri Amrany and Gary Tillery is installed outside Los Angeles' Crypto.com Arena, in the U.S. state of California. The sculpture was unveiled in 2004.

References 

2004 establishments in California
2004 sculptures
Monuments and memorials in Los Angeles
Outdoor sculptures in Greater Los Angeles
Sculptures of African Americans
Sculptures of men in California
South Park (Downtown Los Angeles)
Statues in Los Angeles
Statues of sportspeople